Xochitl Gonzalez (born 1977) is an American writer, screenwriter, and producer. In 2022 she published her debut novel Olga Dies Dreaming which became a New York Times Best Seller on January 30, 2022.

Early life and education 
Gonzalez was born in New York City to a second-generation Puerto Rican mother and Mexican-American father and raised by her grandparents in the area between Bensonhurst and Borough Park. Her parents were activists in the Socialist Workers Party, where her mother was a union organizer who ran for office in the Socialist Workers Party.

Gonzalez attended Edward R. Murrow High School in Brooklyn and earned a scholarship to Brown University. At Brown she intended to study creative writing but ultimately majored in art history. Reflecting on her time at the university, Gonzalez wrote, "Brown was only four hours by car, a lifetime by way of cultural journey. I had dreamt for years of escaping the concrete of Brooklyn for reasons I couldn’t really ever put my finger on." Gonzalez graduated from Brown with a Bachelor of Arts in 1999.

Gonzalez worked as an entrepreneur and consultant for a number of years before earning her MFA from the University of Iowa Writers' Workshop in 2021.

In June 2022, Gonzalez was elected a trustee of Brown University.

Olga Dies Dreaming 

In 2022 she published Olga Dies Dreaming, her debut novel. The book was received positively in reviews by Ron Charles for The Washington Post and Shannon Melero for Jezebel. Regarding the novel, Kirkus Reviews wrote "atmospheric, intelligent, and well informed: an impressive debut." Gonzalez is currently writing and co-executive producing alongside filmmaker Alfonso Gómez-Rejón, a pilot for a drama based on the novel produced by Hulu and starring Aubrey Plaza and Ramon Rodriguez.

References

External links
 Official website

Puerto Rican writers
Brown University alumni
Iowa Writers' Workshop alumni
American writers
21st-century American women writers
Writers from New York City
1977 births
Living people
Date of birth missing (living people)